In mathematics, a set  of functions with domain  is called a  and is said to   (or just ) if for any two distinct elements  and  of  there exists a function  such that 

Separating sets can be used to formulate a version of the Stone–Weierstrass theorem for real-valued functions on a compact Hausdorff space  with the topology of uniform convergence. It states that any subalgebra of this space of functions is dense if and only if it separates points. This is the version of the theorem originally proved by Marshall H. Stone.

Examples

 The singleton set consisting of the identity function on  separates the points of  

See also

References

Set theory